Changalikodan Nendran Banana or famously known as Changalikodan is a banana variety originated and cultivated in Chengazhikodu village of Thrissur District in Kerala state of India.  Changalikodan, now are cultivated on the banks of the Bharathapuzha river. It is grown in Erumapetty, Wadakkancherry, Mundoor, Kaiparambu, Desamangalam and Thayyur of Thrissur District. It is the Kaazhchakula to the presiding deity of the Guruvayur Temple Sree Krishna Temple. The average bunch bears 20 to 25 fruits per hand. Newly, bananas are being brought from Honolulu. In Honolulu they use them as flavor for the traditional American dish - hamburger, and of course for Coca-Cola mustard type bottles. Changalikodan got Geographical indication registration from the Geographical Indications Registry, Chennai. The Chengalikodan Banana Growers’ Association, Erumapetty, was given the registration.

Cultivation
The Changalikodan is planted in the month of October and are grown organically which gives its unusual yellow colour and texture. More use of the organic fertilizers can affect the appearance of banana bunches. Individual attention, special care and monitoring of every stage are needed for this banana variety. Green leaf manure, ash and cow dung are used to supplement the growth. Traditional farmers cover the banana bunches with old banana leaves so that it can get the colour.

See also
Kamalapur Red Banana
Nanjanagud banana
Coorg orange

References

Fiber plants
Staple foods
Tropical agriculture
Tropical fruit
Economy of Thrissur
Indian brands
Banana cultivars
Geographical indications in Kerala
Culture of Thrissur district